The Boucle de l'Artois  is a road bicycle race held annually in France. It was organized as a 2.2 event on the UCI Europe Tour from 2005 to 2009 and again in 2013.

Winners

References

UCI Europe Tour races
Cycle races in France
1990 establishments in France
Recurring sporting events established in 1990